Hylodes babax is a species of frog in the family Hylodidae.

It is endemic to Brazil.

Its natural habitats are subtropical or tropical moist montane forest and rivers.

References

Hylodes
Endemic fauna of Brazil
Amphibians of Brazil
Amphibians described in 1982
Taxonomy articles created by Polbot